Richard Verrall may refer to:

 Richard Verrall (academic)
 Richard Verrall (political writer)